Bruce M. Bailey, (born August 10, 1935), is an American author and humorist who also used the pen name of R. Adam Solo.

Bailey's original name was Marion Bruce Bailey, but he was called "Bruce" by family and friends.  Upon entering the military, he was informed that he would be addressed by his first name, not middle name or a nickname.   He immediately proceeded to the local court house and officially changed his name to Bruce Marion Bailey.  Bruce spent a career in the military flying reconnaissance missions, and upon retiring turned to writing.

Early life
Bruce was born in Crystal Springs, Mississippi, a rural agricultural town, and spent his youth there involved in typical activities of a small town boy.  He was first son of Sidney Bailey and Flayvelle Florence Bruce, his brother John was borne 12 years later.  Bruce was highly intelligent and often found mischief and mayhem as he sought fun and fulfillment in a small town.  During his youth he developed a great love for aviation and aircraft of all types.  As many of America's youth did, he watched the aircraft and the AAF with close interest during the second world war, collecting as many cards, pictures, and data about military airframes as possible.

Military career
He served as Honorary Sergeant and Bugler for an elite National Guard unit for 4 years while still in school (grades 6–10). He started college at Mississippi State and bounced from school to school for nearly 2 years before enlisting in the Marine Corps. He spent 2 years as a reservist in and out of Camp Lejeune and Okinawa, but Marine life did not suit him. He often said the only thing they taught was how to hate and fight, so transferred to the U.S. Air Force Aviation Cadet program designed to commission officers for flight duties (pilots and navigators). Cadets enabled him to fulfill his dream of flying. His latest book, The Elite, tells of his time spent in that program.

His career in the Air Force (1956–77) was spent primarily as an Electronics Warfare Officer flying reconnaissance missions during the cold war.  He has written several books on the subject and has become a sought-after authority.
Bruce has flown different types of aircraft, but most of his 9,000 hours were spent in the RB-47 and RC-135.
Throughout most of his career he flew combat missions and wore the Combat Crew badge.
During the height of the Cold War he was constantly either "On Call" or deployed.
Air Force life was much better suited to Bruce.
He was a highly effective leader and widely recognized as such by his peer and superior officers.
The Air Force also allowed him to put his intellectual capacity to work.
Quickly mastering electronics and Radio Frequency theory and processing, he quickly dominated his specialized field within the community.
By the time of his retirement, Bruce had been awarded the Bronze Star, the Distinguished Flying Cross several times, and many other medals and awards.  His life in the military enabled him to travel the world where he had the opportunity to meet and interact with a wide range of people and cultures.

Life as an Author
Upon retirement, he turned his attention to writing and has published several volumes of historical fiction and non-fiction.  In addition to authoring books, he has also written several magazine articles for US and UK publications.  Bruce is also sought out as an authority on the Cold War.  He has appeared on numerous television programs and magazine interviews, both in the US and Europe.

Family life
Bruce married Fay Louise Olsen on 12 March 1960, in Topeka, Kansas.  They have 4 children; Patti, James, Susie, and John.  Bruce has retired to live in the greater Fort Worth, Texas area.

Publications
The Elite: The Chosen Few, 2007, 
Rencounter (By R. Adam Solo), 2001, 
As the Crow Flies (By R. Adam Solo), 2000, 
Essential, But Expendable (By R. Adam Solo), 2000, 
Flying the RB47, 2000, 
Red-Headed and Wrong-Handed, 1999, 
We See All. a Pictorial History of the 55th Strategic Reconnaissance Wing, 1982

References

Credits

The Invisible Force by Ed Parker, 2005,  credited Bruce for allowing him to use material from his works

1935 births
Living people
American humorists
American male writers
United States Air Force officers
United States Marines
United States Marine Corps reservists
Recipients of the Distinguished Flying Cross (United States)